Amy Elisabeth Jönsson Raaholt (born 8 June 1967) is a former professional tennis player from Norway. She was born Amy Jönsson.

Biography
Jönsson, who was born in the Swedish city of Gothenburg, debuted for the Norway Fed Cup team in 1985.

Her best performance on the WTA Tour came at Bastad in 1987 when she made the quarter-finals, a run which included a win over eighth seed Carina Karlsson.

At the 1988 Australian Open she featured in the women's singles and doubles draws. She was beaten in the first round of the singles by top seed Steffi Graf, who went on to win the title. In the doubles she and partner Helena Dahlström reached the second round.

Her last Fed Cup appearance came in 1995 and she finished with a 30/19 overall win–loss record, from a total of 28 ties. She holds the record for the most Fed Cup matches won for Norway, both in singles and doubles
 	
She has a daughter, Andrea Raaholt, who plays tennis professionally.

ITF finals

Singles: 6 (3–3)

Doubles: 4 (2–2)

References

External links
 
 
 

1967 births
Living people
Norwegian female tennis players
Swedish emigrants to Norway
Sportspeople from Gothenburg
20th-century Norwegian women